Super Smash Bros. for Wii U, sometimes abbreviated as Smash 4, is a crossover fighting video game for the Wii U. Players control one of 58 characters drawn from Nintendo and third-party game franchises, and try to knock their opponents out of an arena. Each player has a percentage meter which rises as they take damage; characters become easier to knock into the air or out of bounds as the percentage increases.

Games in the Super Smash Bros. series have been played competitively since the early 2000s, but the inclusion of Super Smash Bros. Melee at the 2013 edition of Evolution Championship Series (EVO), a major multi-game tournament, was seen as a turning point; after EVO 2013, competitive Smash saw an increase in tournaments, media coverage, and attention from Nintendo. Super Smash Bros. for Wii U is the fourth Smash Bros. title; all four have been played competitively, as has a fan-made mod of Super Smash Bros. Brawl, Project M. While Smash for Wii U tournament rules initially varied, by 2016 they had standardized; the first player to knock their opponent out of the arena twice within a six-minute match timer wins the set. Matches are played as best-of-three sets in early rounds of the tournament and best-of-five sets in later rounds. Tournaments use the double-elimination format; after their first loss players are sent to a lower bracket to compete against other players on their first loss, and following their second loss players are eliminated from the competition.

Super Smash Bros. for Wii U was released in North America and Europe in November 2014 and in Japan the following month. The game was both a critical and commercial success; it received strong reviews, and became the fastest-selling Wii U game in the United States, with almost half a million copies sold within its first three days. As of March 2020, it sold over 5.3 million copies. However, despite the game's popularity, prize pools for Smash tournaments were well below those of other esports. Unlike many other developers, Nintendo does not contribute to tournament prize pools. At EVO 2017, Smash for Wii U had 1,515 competitors and a prize pool of $15,150, funded entirely from entrance fees. At the same tournament, Injustice 2 had a prize pool of $50,000, despite having around half as many competitors, due to funding from its publisher, Warner Bros. Interactive. Gonzalo "ZeRo" Barrios, widely considered the greatest Smash for Wii U player of all time, stated in 2018 that one could earn more by working at McDonald's than by winning EVO, and that he had earned only $45,000 for winning a world record 56 consecutive tournaments across 2015 and 2016.

Smash Bros. tournaments are generally seeded so that the best players do not face off against each other until the later stages of an event. The most authoritative ranking of Super Smash Bros. for Wii U players is the Panda Global Rankings (PGR). Five editions of the PGR rankings were released, covering tournaments held between 2015 and 2018. The PGR 100, a ranking of the 100 best Smash for Wii U players of all time, was released after the last regular ranking, and factored six more major tournaments into the rankings. In late 2018 the next Super Smash Bros. title, Ultimate, was released, and the PGR shifted to cover that game. In the first two rankings, covering 2015 and 2016, the PGR designated a combined 13 tournaments as major events with increased influence on the rankings. Beginning with the third edition of the PGR, tournaments were grouped into one of four tiers – S, A, B, and C – based on the number of competitors with S being the most prestigious tier and C the least. In the fifth PGR, S was replaced with A+. This list contains all PGR majors, S-tier, A+-tier, and A-tier events from the release of Smash for Wii U through the end of the PGR in 2018.

PGR major tournaments 

The following is a list of results from Super Smash Bros. for Wii U tournaments in 2015 and 2016 considered major by the Panda Global Rankings.

PGR S-tier and A+-tier tournaments 

The following is a list of results from Super Smash Bros. for Wii U tournaments considered S-tier or A+-tier by the Panda Global Rankings.

PGR A-tier tournaments 

The following is a list of results from Super Smash Bros. for Wii U tournaments considered A-tier by the Panda Global Rankings.

Notes

References

Wii U